South Korea competed at the 2020 Summer Olympics in Tokyo. Originally scheduled to take place from 24 July to 9 August 2020, the Games were postponed to 23 July to 8 August 2021, because of the COVID-19 pandemic.

Medalists

| width="60%" align="left" valign="top" |

| width="20%" align="left" valign="top" |

| width="20%" align="left" valign="top" |

Competitors
The following is the list of number of competitors in the Games:

Archery

South Korean archers qualified each for the men's and women's events by reaching the quarterfinal stage of their respective team recurves at the 2019 World Archery Championships in 's-Hertogenbosch, Netherlands.

The South Korean archery team for the rescheduled Games was announced on 24 April 2021, including London 2012 gold medalist Oh Jin-hyek and Rio 2016 Olympian and former world record holder Kim Woo-jin.

Men

Women

Mixed

Athletics

South Korean athletes further achieved the entry standards, either by qualifying time or by world ranking, in the following track and field events (up to a maximum of 3 athletes in each event):

Track & road events

Field events

Badminton

South Korea entered ten badminton players (three men and seven women) for the following events based on the BWF Race to Tokyo Rankings: two entries in the women's singles, one in the men's singles, two pairs in the women's doubles, and a pair each in the men's and mixed doubles.

Men

Women

Mixed

Baseball

South Korea national baseball team qualified for the Olympics by advancing to the final match and securing an outright berth as the highest-ranked squad from Asia and Oceania, excluding the host nation Japan, at the 2019 WBSC Premier12 in Tokyo.

Summary

Team roster

Group play

Round 1

Round 2

Semifinals

Bronze medal game

Basketball

Summary

Women's tournament

South Korea women's basketball team qualified for the Olympics as one of three highest-ranked eligible squads from group B at the Belgrade meet of the 2020 FIBA Women's Olympic Qualifying Tournament, marking the country's recurrence to the sport for the first time in 12 years.

Team roster

Group play

Boxing 

South Korea entered two female boxers for the first time into the Olympic tournament. Im Ae-ji (women's featherweight) and defending Asian Games champion Oh Yeon-ji (women's lightweight) secured the spots on the South Korean squad by advancing to the semifinal match of their respective weight divisions at the 2020 Asia & Oceania Qualification Tournament in Amman, Jordan.

Canoeing

Sprint
South Korea qualified a single boat (men's K-1 200 m) for the Games by winning the gold medal at the 2021 Asian Canoe Sprint Qualification Regatta in Pattaya, Thailand.

Qualification Legend: FA = Qualify to final (medal); FB = Qualify to final B (non-medal); SF = Qualify to semifinal; QF = Qualify to quarterfinal

Cycling

Road
South Korea entered one rider to compete in the women's Olympic road race, by securing an outright berth, as the highest-ranked cyclist, not yet qualified, at the 2019 Asian Championships in Tashkent, Uzbekistan.

Track
Following the completion of the 2020 UCI Track Cycling World Championships, South Korea entered one rider to compete in the women's sprint and keirin based on her final individual UCI Olympic rankings.

Sprint

Keirin

Diving

South Korean divers qualified for five individual spots and the men's synchronized springboard team at the Games through the 2019 FINA World Championships and the 2021 FINA Diving World Cup.

Equestrian

South Korea entered one dressage rider into the Olympic equestrian competition, by finishing in the top two, outside the group selection, of the individual FEI Olympic Rankings for Group G (South East Asia and Oceania).

Dressage

Qualification Legend: Q = Qualified for the final; q = Qualified for the final as a lucky loser

Fencing

South Korean fencers qualified a full squad each in the men's and women's team sabre and women's team épée at the Games by finishing among the top four nations in the FIE Olympic Team Rankings, while the men's épée team claimed the spot each as the highest-ranked nation from Asia outside the world's top four. 2018 Asian Games men's foil champion Lee Kwang-hyun and two-time Olympian Jeon Hee-sook (women's foil) earned additional places on the South Korean team as one of the two highest-ranked fencers vying for qualification from Asia and Oceania in their respective individual events of the FIE Adjusted Official Rankings.

Men

Women

Football

Summary

Men's tournament

South Korea men's football team qualified for the Olympics by advancing to the final match of the 2020 AFC U-23 Championship in Thailand.

Team roster

Group play

Quarterfinal

Golf

South Korea entered two male and four female golfers into the Olympic tournament.

Gymnastics

Artistic
South Korea qualified seven artistic gymnasts into the Olympic competition: a full men's team of four, which will compete in the team competition, as well as one man and two women competing as individuals. The men's squad claimed one of nine remaining spots in the team competition at the 2019 World Championships in Stuttgart, Germany (China, Russia, & Japan had already qualified at the 2018 World Championships), and Shin Jea-hwan qualified through the World Cup Series, finishing first in the standings on men's VT. On the women's side, Lee Yun-seo earned a berth through her placement in the all-around at the 2019 World Championships, while Yeo Seo-jeong, with her finish in the event finals on vault, secured an additional berth available for gymnasts who did not qualify through either the team or the all-around through the apparatus finals at the same event. The individual qualifiers, including those who qualified due to their performances on individual events, are eligible to compete in all events at the Olympics.

Men
Team

Individual

Women

Handball

Summary

Women's tournament

The South Korean women's handball team qualified for the Olympics by winning the gold medal at the 2019 Asian Qualification Tournament in Chuzhou, China.

Team roster

Group play

Quarterfinal

Judo

Men

Women

Mixed

Karate
 
South Korea entered one karateka into the inaugural Olympic tournament. Park Hee-jun qualified directly for the men's kata category by finishing third in the final pool round at the 2021 World Olympic Qualification Tournament in Paris, France.

Kata

Modern pentathlon

South Korean athletes qualified for the following spots to compete in modern pentathlon. Rio 2016 Olympian Jun Woong-tae secured his selection in the men's race by winning the bronze medal and sealing one of three spots available at the 2019 UIPM World Championships in Budapest, Hungary. Meanwhile, Asian Games silver medalists Lee Ji-hun and Kim Se-hee confirmed places each in their respective events with gold-medal victories at the 2019 Asia & Oceania Championships in Kunming, China. Jung Jin-hwa replaces Lee Ji-hun.

Rowing

South Korea qualified one boat in the women's single sculls for the Games by finishing sixth in the A-final and securing the third of five berths available at the 2021 FISA Asia & Oceania Olympic Qualification Regatta in Tokyo, Japan.

Qualification Legend: FA=Final A (medal); FB=Final B (non-medal); FC=Final C (non-medal); FD=Final D (non-medal); FE=Final E (non-medal); FF=Final F (non-medal); SA/B=Semifinals A/B; SC/D=Semifinals C/D; SE/F=Semifinals E/F; QF=Quarterfinals; R=Repechage

Rugby sevens

Summary

Men's tournament

South Korea national rugby sevens team qualified for the Games by winning the gold medal and securing a lone outright berth at the 2019 Asian Olympic Qualifying Tournament in Incheon, marking the country's debut in the sport.

Team roster

Group play

9–12th place playoff

11th place match

Sailing

South Korean sailors qualified one boat in each of the following classes through the 2018 Sailing World Championships, the class-associated Worlds, the 2018 Asian Games, and the continental regattas.

M = Medal race; EL = Eliminated – did not advance into the medal race

Shooting

South Korean shooters achieved quota places for the following events by virtue of their best finishes at the 2018 ISSF World Championships, the 2019 ISSF World Cup series, and Asian Championships, as long as they obtained a minimum qualifying score (MQS) by May 31, 2020.

Fourteen shooters (seven per gender) were selected to the South Korean roster at the end of the national trials, with pistol ace and four-time gold medalist Jin Jong-oh leading them to his fifth consecutive Games and Kim Min-ji setting her historic comeback to the Games for the first time in 13 years. Meanwhile, Nam Tae-yun earned a direct place in the men's 10 m air rifle for the rescheduled Games as the highest-ranked shooter vying for qualification in the ISSF World Olympic Rankings of 6 June 2021.

Men

Women

Mixed

Sport climbing

South Korea entered two sport climbers into the Olympic tournament. With the IFSC Asian Championships cancelled because of the travel restrictions brought by the COVID-19 pandemic, Chon Jong-won and Seo Chae-hyun received the unused berths respectively, as the continent's highest-ranked male and female sport climber vying for qualification, at the 2019 Worlds in Hachioji, Japan.

Swimming

South Korean swimmers further achieved qualifying standards in the following events (up to a maximum of 2 swimmers in each event at the Olympic Qualifying Time (OQT), and potentially 1 at the Olympic Selection Time (OST)):

Men

Women

Table tennis

South Korea entered six athletes into the table tennis competition at the Games. The men's and women's teams secured one of nine available places, respectively, at the 2020 World Olympic Qualification Event in Gondomar, Portugal, permitting a maximum of two starters to compete each in the men's and women's singles tournament.

Men

Women

Mixed

Taekwondo

South Korea entered six athletes into the taekwondo competition at the Games. Jang Jun (men's 58 kg), double Olympic medalist Lee Dae-hoon (men's 68 kg), In Kyo-don (men's +80 kg), and world champions Sim Jae-young (women's 49 kg), Lee Ah-reum (women's 57 kg), and Lee Da-bin (women's +67 kg) qualified directly for their respective weight classes by finishing among the top five taekwondo practitioners at the end of the WT Olympic Rankings.

Tennis

South Korea  entered one tennis player into the Olympic tournament, Kwon Soon-woo qualified for the men's singles.

Volleyball

Indoor
Summary

Women's tournament

The South Korean women's volleyball team qualified for the Olympics by winning the final match and securing an outright berth at the Asian Olympic Qualification Tournament in Nakhon Ratchasima, Thailand.

Team roster

Group play

Quarterfinal

Semifinal

Bronze medal game

Weightlifting

South Korea entered eight weightlifters into the Olympic competition. Rio 2016 Olympians Won Jeong-sik (men's 73 kg) and Yu Dong-ju (men's 96 kg), Jin Yun-seong (men's 109 kg), Ham Eun-ji (women's 55 kg), Kim Su-hyeon (women's 76 kg), and Lee Seon-mi (women's +87 kg) secured one of the top eight slots each in their respective weight divisions based on the IWF Absolute World Rankings, with Han Myeong-mok and Kang Yeoun-hee topping the field of weightlifters from the Asian zone in the men's 67 kg and women's 87 kg category, respectively, based on the IWF Absolute Continental Rankings. Won Jeong-sik withdrew from competition prior to the start of his event due to an ankle injury.

Men

Women

Wrestling

South Korea qualified two wrestlers for each of the following weight classes into the Olympic competition; all of whom progressed to the top two finals of the men's Greco-Roman wrestling (67 and 130 kg), respectively, at the 2021 Asian Qualification Tournament in Almaty, Kazakhstan.

Greco-Roman

Politics
South Korean politicians took issue with a map of the torch relay on the Games' official website, which depicted the disputed Liancourt Rocks (territory claimed by Japan but governed by South Korea) as part of Japan. "South Korea, through the Japanese embassy in South Korea, has lodged a protest on the issue," Japan's then cabinet secretary Yoshihide Suga said, "Japan told the South Korean side that the protest is not acceptable given that Japan owns Takeshima and given Japan's position on the Sea of Japan."

The South Korean government also called for a ban of the Rising Sun Flag in the Olympic Games, due to being considered to be offensive as a consequence of its usage by the Imperial Japanese military during World War II. In September 2019, the South Korean parliamentary committee for sports asked the organisers of 2020 Summer Olympics in Tokyo to ban the Rising Sun Flag.

On 8 August 2021, the final day of the Tokyo 2020 Summer Olympics, the South Korean Olympic Committee announced, "The IOC has declared in a letter that the Rising Sun Flag violates the Olympic Charter. It will be banned at the Olympics." In response, the Tokyo Organising Committee of the Olympic Games announced on 9 August, "The announcement by the South Korean Olympic Committee is not true. When we contacted the IOC, we confirmed that the IOC will continue to respond to the issue on a case-by-case basis and will not impose a blanket ban. On the morning of 9 August, the IOC sent a letter to South Korea indicating that the use of the flag will be determined on a case-by-case basis."

References

Nations at the 2020 Summer Olympics
2020
2021 in South Korean sport